The 1897 VMI Keydets football team represented the Virginia Military Institute (VMI) in their seventh season of organized football. The Keydets went 3–2 under first-year head coach R. N. Groner.

Schedule

References

VMI
VMI Keydets football seasons
VMI Keydets football